Note: The , originally commissioned as SS George Calvert (build number 2007/MC Hull 20) should not be confused with SS George Calvert (build number 2016/MC Hull 29) which was constructed shortly thereafter.

SS George Calvert was a Liberty ship built in the United States during World War II. She was named after George Calvert, an English politician and colonizer. Calvert took an interest in the British colonization of the Americas, becoming the proprietor of the Province of Avalon, the first sustained English settlement on the southeastern peninsula on the island of Newfoundland. He later sought a new royal charter to settle the region, which would become the state of Maryland.

Two Liberty ship with same name
, originally launched as SS George Calvert (build number 2007/MC Hull 20), should not be confused with this SS George Calvert (build number 2016/MC Hull 29) which was constructed shortly thereafter.

Hull number 20 was reportedly set aside after launch due to structural problems during assembly. As a result, hull number 29 was given her name. Hull number 29 was sunk in May 1942, and, as a result, when hull number 20 was turned over as "ready-for-issue" to the War Shipping Administration in 1943, there was no reason to change her name since hull number 29 no longer existed.

Construction
George Calvert was laid down on 19 November 1941, under a Maritime Commission (MARCOM) contract, MCE hull 29, by the Bethlehem-Fairfield Shipyard, Baltimore, Maryland; she was sponsored by Mrs. William C. Sealey, the daughter of L.R. Sanford, the chief of the inspection section at Bethlehem-Fairfield Shipyard, and was launched on 14 March 1942.

History
She was allocated to A.H. Bull & Co., Inc., on 30 April 1942.

Sinking
The remaining crew of eight officers, 33 crewmen, and 10 Armed guards abandoned the sinking ship in three lifeboats. U-753 launched at least one more torpedo at 20:03, which struck George Calvert amidship, braking the ship in half and causing her to sink immediately. The survivors were later questioned by U-753 about the ships name, tonnage, and cargo. They landed at Dimas, Cuba, on 21 May 1942.

See also

Further reading
 Blair, Clay, Hitler's U-Boat War, the hunters, 1939-1942. Random House, 1996. .
 Chronological List of Ships Sunk or Damaged during January to June 1942
 Jay G. Lopez, Radio Operator, Four Star Seaman (torpedoed 4 times)

References

Bibliography

 
 
 
 
 

 

 

1942 ships
Liberty ships
Maritime incidents in May 1942
Ships sunk by German submarines in World War II